Diary for My Mother and Father is a 1990 Hungarian film directed by Márta Mészáros.

Synopsis 

This story follows a young student, who is orphaned as she grows to adulthood in the shadow of the 1956 Hungarian uprising. Coming from the Communist intelligentsia, she sees her friends and family react differently. Her lover, a married factory manager, supports the patriots and later assists fellow workers in staging a strike. Meanwhile her sister and others express anger at being forced from their homes during the revolution and continue to express a hatred for the rebels afterwards. But in the end they realize that for all people, real life is not possible after the revolt and its brutal suppression by the Soviets and their collaborators. 

A particularly surreal scene involves a New Year's Eve party in which the participants wear costumes. An intoxicated woman yells anti-government curses out of the window. Within a very short time police arrive and look suspiciously at the guests, who are all wearing ridiculous costumes.

External links 
 

Hungarian drama films
1990 films
1990s Hungarian-language films
Films about orphans
Films directed by Márta Mészáros